LSRC may refer to:

 Levine Science Research Center, a facility at Duke University
 Lake State Railway, a railroad in Michigan